Lerche is surname of:

 Jacob Lerche Johansen (1818–1900), Norwegian naval officer and politician
 Julius Lerche (1836-1914), German politician
 Peter Lerche (1928-2016), German jurist
 Sondre Lerche (born 1982), Norwegian singer, songwriter and guitarist

It may also refer to:
Lerche (studio), a Japanese animation studio

See also 
 Heinkel Lerche
 Lerche–Newberger sum rule

German-language surnames
Norwegian-language surnames

de:Lerche (Begriffsklärung)